Sergio Castel Martínez (born 22 February 1995) is a Spanish footballer who plays as a forward for Burgos CF.

Club career
Born in Madrid ,Spain Castel made his senior debut with Tercera División side UE Rubí, in the 2012–13 season. In July 2013, he joined CA Osasuna and returned to the youth setup, but on 31 January of the following year, he was loaned to CD Tudelano in Segunda División B, for six months.

In July 2014, Castel moved to CD Lealtad also in the third division, but left the club in November after featuring rarely. He then signed for Las Rozas CF, a club he already represented as a youth, before moving abroad to Bendigo City FC in Australia.

Castel only returned to Spain on 25 January 2017, after agreeing to a contract with AD Alcorcón's reserves in the fourth division. On 18 August, he moved to third level club UD San Sebastián de los Reyes.

In August 2019, after scoring a career-best 13 goals for Sanse, Castel joined Atlético Madrid, being initially assigned to the B-team; subsequently, he was loaned to Indian Super League side Jamshedpur FC until the end of the year. On 2 October 2020, he moved to third division side UD Ibiza also in a temporary deal.

On 14 July 2021, after being a regular starter in their first-ever promotion to Segunda División, Castel signed a permanent two-year contract with Ibiza. He left the club on 23 January 2023, and signed for fellow second division team Burgos CF seven days later.

References

External links

1995 births
Living people
Sportspeople from Biscay
Spanish footballers
Footballers from the Basque Country (autonomous community)
Association football forwards
Segunda División B players
Tercera División players
Divisiones Regionales de Fútbol players
UE Rubí players
CD Tudelano footballers
CD Lealtad players
Las Rozas CF players
AD Alcorcón B players
Atlético Madrid B players
UD Ibiza players
Burgos CF footballers
Than Quang Ninh FC players
Indian Super League players
Jamshedpur FC players
Spanish expatriate footballers
Spanish expatriate sportspeople in Australia
Spanish expatriate sportspeople in Vietnam
Spanish expatriate sportspeople in India
Expatriate soccer players in Australia
Expatriate footballers in Vietnam
Expatriate footballers in India